Jacques L. Trudel (13 April 1919 – 30 January 2004) was a Liberal party
member of the House of Commons of Canada. He was born in Montreal, Quebec and became a police officer and sales manager by career.

He was first elected at the Bourassa riding in the 1968 general election serving in the 28th Canadian Parliament. He was re-elected in the 1972 and 1974 federal elections, when the riding became known as Montreal—Bourassa. Trudel left federal political office after completing his term in the 30th Parliament.

Electoral record (partial)

References
 

1919 births
2004 deaths
Members of the House of Commons of Canada from Quebec
Liberal Party of Canada MPs
Service de police de la Ville de Montréal